Tom Nelson (3 February 1883 – 3 July 1957) was an Australian rules footballer who played with Collingwood in the Victorian Football League (VFL). Nelson wrote the lyrics to the club song, "Good Old Collingwood Forever" to  tune of "Goodbye, Dolly Gray".

Notes

External links 

		
Tom Nelson's profile at Collingwood Forever

1883 births
1957 deaths
Australian rules footballers from Victoria (Australia)
Collingwood Football Club players
Yarraville Football Club players